Haplomitrium hookeri, the Hooker's flapwort,  is a species of liverwort from the United Kingdom.

References

Plants described in 1813
Flora of Great Britain
Calobryales